Brother Marie-Victorin (1885–1944) was the founder of the Montreal botanical garden.

Marie-Victorin may also refer to:

 Marie-Victorin Statue, a monument in Montreal, at the botanical garden
 Prix Marie-Victorin, an award for scientific achievement in Quebec
 Marie-Victorin (electoral district), an electoral district in Quebec
 Marie-Victorin, an electoral district within the borough of Rosemont–La Petite-Patrie for the Montreal City Council
 Cégep Marie-Victorin, a CEGEP (junior college) in Quebec
 Commission scolaire Marie-Victorin, a school board in Quebec